Thore Christian Elias Fries (3 November 1886 – 31 December 1930  son of Theodor Magnus Fries and brother of  Robert Elias Fries) was  Professor of Systematic Botany at Lund University. He specialized in lichenology and plant geography. This botanist is denoted by the author abbreviation T.C.E.Fr. when citing a botanical name. He did his field work and travelled in India and Africa

He was a member  of the British Mycological Society and associated with many botanical gardens and other museums.

References

Systematic Botany – History at www.systbot.uu.se 
http://www.systbot.uu.se/information/history/fries.

External links

Botanists with author abbreviations
1886 births
1930 deaths
Fries, Robert Elias
Fries, Robert Elias
Swedish botanists
Burials at Uppsala old cemetery